The Österreichische Beteiligungs AG (ÖBAG; English: Austria Holding PLC) is an Austrian state-owned holding company that can be characterized as a sovereign wealth fund. It administers the investments of the Republic of Austria in partially or entirely nationalized companies. It is headquartered in Vienna.

History
In 1967, the Österreichische Industrieverwaltungs-GmbH (Austrian industry administration GmbH) was established to centralize the administration of the interests in nationalized companies. It was transformed to the Österreichische Industrieverwaltungs-AG (Austrian industry administration AG) in 1970 and at the same instant got assigned the shares of the nationalized companies. The ÖIAG (since 1986) and the companies it owned formed a group (the Austrian Industries AG) until 1993, when this group was split and the ÖIAG was instructed to privatize the companies it owned.

In 2015, the Austrian state holding ÖIAG was turned into a limited liability company (GesmbH) called Österreichische Bundes- und Industriebeteiligungsholding (ÖBIB), which was permitted to make new acquisitions and which reported directly to the Ministry of Finance. In 2018, the ÖBIB was reorganized into a public limited company again, called Österreichische Beteiligungs AG (ÖBAG).

Investments
The ÖBAG holds shares in:
 31.50% of the Oil producer OMV
 28.42% of the A1 Telekom Austria Group
 52.85% of the Österreichische Post
 33.20% of the Casinos Austria
 32.53% of the APK Pensionskasse, an Austrian pension fund
 100% of the IMIB, a real estate and industry holding
 100.00% of the GKB Bergbau GmbH, a mining holding
 100.00% of the Finanzmarkt Beteiligungs AG (FIMBAG) in Liquidation
 100% of the Schoeller-Bleckmann steel mill

Severe protests from politicians, unions and workers' councils were the results of the privatisation of some of the ÖBAG’s former investments. Former investments were:
 voestalpine
 Austrian Airlines
 SGP Verkehrstechnik
 Austria Mikro Systeme International AG
 Austria Technologie & Systemtechnik AG (AT & S)
 Austria Metall AG (AMAG)
 Berndorf (1957 merged with AMAG, in 1984 split again)
 Böhler-Uddeholm
 Österreichische Salinen
 Austria Tabak AG
 The auction house Dorotheum
 Österreichische Staatsdruckerei (federal printing plant)
 Flughafen Wien AG (Vienna International Airport)
 Schoeller-Bleckmann
 Siemens AG Österreich
 VA Technologie AG (VA Tech)

References

Government-owned companies of Austria
Sovereign wealth funds
Companies based in Vienna